Stefan Trevor Oakes (born 6 September 1978) is an English former professional footballer, who notably represented Leicester City in the Premier League during a career which began in 1998 and ended in 2013.

Career

Leicester City
Oakes was born in Leicester, Leicestershire. A left-footed midfielder, he began his career at Leicester City. Given his debut as a substitute in a 2–4 defeat to Chelsea at Filbert Street at the age of 19, he represented Leicester in the 2000 League Cup final at Wembley Stadium.

Oakes was released by manager Micky Adams on 4 March 2003.

Walsall
Following his release by Leicester, Oakes opted to join Colin Lee's Walsall.

Notts County
He then moved to Notts County but, despite being a regular starter and fans' favourite at the club, he rejected the offer of a new contract in the summer of 2005 and moved to their League Two rivals, Wycombe Wanderers.

Wycombe Wanderers
Oakes spent three seasons with Wycombe, making a total of 96 appearances in League Two and scoring five goals, before moving to Lincoln City.

Lincoln City
On 9 June 2008, Oakes agreed to join Lincoln City on a two-year contract, after declining a new contract offer at Wycombe Wanderers.

On 29 May 2009, following the signing of Richard Butcher, Oakes was told that he was free to leave Lincoln City by Imps' boss Peter Jackson. He departed Sincil Bank on 30 March 2010 after agreeing to cancel his contract with the club.

Tamworth
Following his release from Lincoln City, Oakes undertook pre-season trials with both Mansfield Town and Halesowen Town before signing for Conference National side Tamworth on 11 August 2010.

Move to F.C. New York
On 20 December 2010, it was announced that Oakes was leaving Tamworth to pursue a playing and coaching career in the United States at New York based club, F.C. New York.

Return to England
On 5 January 2013 it was announced that Oakes had signed for United Counties League side Oadby Town
.

He left Oadby in April 2013, to resume his coaching career in the United States.

Personal life
Oakes' brother Scott was also a professional footballer. Their father Trevor Oakes was a guitarist in the band Showaddywaddy.

Honours
Leicester City
League Cup: 1999-00

Career statistics

References

External links

Official Wycombe Profile

1978 births
Living people
Footballers from Leicester
English footballers
Association football midfielders
Leicester City F.C. players
Crewe Alexandra F.C. players
Walsall F.C. players
Notts County F.C. players
Wycombe Wanderers F.C. players
Lincoln City F.C. players
Tamworth F.C. players
Premier League players
English Football League players
National League (English football) players